The Dossen is a mountain in the Bernese Alps, overlooking Rosenlaui in the Bernese Oberland. It is located east of the Rosenlaui Glacier. The Dossen is composed of two summits: the northern summit (3,138 m) and southern summit (3,144 m).

The Dossenhütte (owned by the Swiss Alpine Club) is used on the normal route.

Pictures

References

External links
 Dossen on Hikr

Mountains of the Alps
Alpine three-thousanders
Mountains of Switzerland
Mountains of the canton of Bern